Bhalaipur  is a village in Kapurthala district of Punjab State, India. The village is administrated by a Sarpanch who is an elected representative of village as per the constitution of India and Panchayati raj (India).

Demography
According to the report published by Census India in 2011, Bhalaipur has a total number of 30 houses and population of 166 of which include 84 males and 82 females. Literacy rate of Bhalaipur is  71.72%, lower than state average of 75.84%.  The population of children under the age of 6 years is 21 which is  12.65% of total population of Bhalaipur, and child sex ratio is approximately  1100, higher than state average of 846.

Population data

Air travel connectivity 
The closest airport to the village is Sri Guru Ram Dass Jee International Airport.

Villages in Kapurthala

External links
  Villages in Kapurthala
 Kapurthala Villages List

References

Villages in Kapurthala district